Félix Vicq d'Azyr (23 April 1748 – 20 June 1794) was a French physician and anatomist, the originator of comparative anatomy and discoverer of the theory of homology in biology.

Biography
Vicq d'Azyr was born in Valognes, Normandy, the son of a physician. He graduated in medicine at the University of Paris and became a renowned and brilliant animal and human anatomist and physician.

From 1773 Vicq d'Azyr taught a celebrated course of anatomy at the Jardin du Roi, currently the Museum of Natural History, in Paris. In 1774 he was elected a member of the Académie des Sciences with the support of his friend Condorcet, the Perpetual Secretary. In this latter capacity, he was in charge of writing the eulogies of his colleagues. This he accomplished with  great talent, thus winning a lifetime membership to the Académie française in 1788. On the outbreak of an epidemic in Guyenne he was charged with writing a report, of making propositions and with their execution. Pursuing an early perception of the responsibility of the State on health affairs, Anne-Robert-Jacques Turgot proposed the creation of the Société Royale de Médecine.  In 1775, Vicq d'Azyr was made Perpetual Secretary. Under his leadership, the Société  compiled over 16 years a great mass of facts and information about diseases, physicians, economics and food resources.

He was the last physician of Queen Marie-Antoinette, whom he tried to protect.
Additionally he was a professor of veterinary medicine at the School of Alfort, as well as Superintendent of epidemics.

As an anatomist he was one of the first to use coronal sections of the brain and to use alcohol to aid dissection. He described the locus coeruleus, the locus niger (substantia nigra) in the brain, in 1786, and the band of Vicq d'Azyr, a fiber system between the external granular layer and the external pyramidal layer of the cerebral cortex, as well as the Mamillo-thalamic tract, which bears his name. His systematic studies of the cerebral convolutions  became a classic and Vicq d'Azyr was one of the first neuroanatomists to name the gyri. He studied the deep gray nuclei of the cerebrum and the basal ganglia. He participated in the Second Encyclopedia. During the French Revolution he was elected to the Commission temporaire des arts, where he was charged with determining the future of anatomical education in France.

Vicq d'Azyr died of tuberculosis on 20 June 1794 during The Terror. He had that day attended Robespierre's Festival of the Supreme Being. His dramatic biography describes him as spending his last remaining years shaken by nightmares and terrified of the guillotine.

A collection of some of his papers is held at the National Library of Medicine in Bethesda, Maryland.

Bibliography

 
 
 
 Éloges
 Mémoires sur l'Anatomie Humaine et Comparée
 
 Système Anatomique des Quadrupèdes

References
Notes

Bibliography

External links
 Mandressi, R. Félix Vicq d'Azyr : l'anatomie, l'État, la médecine. In French.

1748 births
1794 deaths
People from Manche
French anatomists
University of Paris alumni
18th-century French physicians
18th-century deaths from tuberculosis
Members of the Académie Française
Members of the French Academy of Sciences
Tuberculosis deaths in France